"Don't Wanna Go to Bed Now" is a song by Australian singer–songwriter Gabriella Cilmi from her debut album, Lessons to Be Learned (2008). Written by Cilmi, Nick Coler, Miranda Cooper, Brian Higgins, Tim Powell, and Shawn Lee, the track was released as the album's second Australian single on 21 July 2008. It debuted at number thirty-one on the Australian ARIA Singles Chart the week of 28 July 2008. Despite only attaining a peak position of number twenty-eight, "Don't Wanna Go to Bed Now" became Australia's twenty-fourth best-selling single of 2008 by a native artist. The song appears on the soundtrack to the Australian crime television series City Homicide.

In the music video Cilmi is seen partying all night holding and popping balloons, while singing in different rooms and outfits.

Track listing
Australian CD single
"Don't Wanna Go to Bed Now" (single version) – 3:13
"Sweet About Me" (live version) – 3:40
"Cry Me a River" (live version) – 3:39

Charts

Weekly charts

Year-end charts

References

2008 singles
2008 songs
Gabriella Cilmi songs
Mushroom Records singles
Song recordings produced by Xenomania
Songs written by Brian Higgins (producer)
Songs written by Miranda Cooper
Songs written by Nick Coler
Songs written by Shawn Lee (musician)
Songs written by Tim Powell (producer)
Songs written by Gabriella Cilmi